Noșlac is a commune located in Alba County, Transylvania, Romania. It is composed of six villages: Căptălan (Maroskáptalan), Copand (Maroskoppánd), Găbud (Gábod), Noșlac, Stâna de Mureș (Maroscsúcs), and Valea Ciuciului (Zilahipatak).

Geography
The commune lies on the Transylvanian Plateau, on the left bank of the river Mureș, close to where the river Fărău flows into the Mureș. 

Noșlac is located in the northeastern corner of Alba County, on the border with Cluj and Mureș counties.

References

Communes in Alba County
Localities in Transylvania